Clemente Tellechea (born 23 November 1932) is an Argentine alpine skier. He competed in three events at the 1960 Winter Olympics.

References

1932 births
Living people
Argentine male alpine skiers
Olympic alpine skiers of Argentina
Alpine skiers at the 1960 Winter Olympics
Place of birth missing (living people)